Niki-Khita (Nikhi-Xitha) is a rural locality (a selo) in Kurchaloyevsky District, Chechnya.

Administrative and municipal status 
Municipally, Niki-Khita is incorporated into Regitinskoye rural settlement. It is one of four settlements included in it.

Geography 

Niki-Khita is located in the upper reaches of the Bokh-Dzhaga River.

The nearest settlements to Niki-Khita are Avtury in the north-west, Geldagana in the north, the city of Kurchaloy in the north-east, Dzhaglargi in the east, Marzoy-Mokhk and Regita in the south-east, and Serzhen-Yurt in the west.

History 
In 1944, after the genocide and deportation of the Chechen and Ingush people and the Chechen-Ingush ASSR was abolished, the village of Niki-Khita was renamed and settled by people from the neighboring republic of Dagestan. From 1944 to 1957, it was a part of the Vedensky District of the Dagestan ASSR.

In 1958, after the Vaynakh people returned and the Chechen-Ingush ASSR was restored, the village regained its old Chechen name, Niki-Khita.

Population 
 1990 Census: 318
 2002 Census: 320
 2010 Census: 657
 2019 estimate: ?

According to the results of the 2010 Census, the majority of residents of Niki-Khita were ethnic Chechens.

References 

Rural localities in Kurchaloyevsky District